Johann Hubert Salentin (born January 15, 1822, Zülpich, died July 7, 1910, Düsseldorf) was a German painter, associated with the Düsseldorf school of painting.

 
Salentin was a blacksmith for 14 years. It was until 1850 that he came to the Düsseldorf Academy, where Wilhelm von Schadow, Carl Ferdinand son Adolph Tidemand where his main teachers. He deals with fondness gemütvolle scenes from rural life in the West German country, which by correct drawing and the use of clear colors in liquid treatment excels. Salentin was representative of the Düsseldorfer School of painters.

Currently paintings of Salentin are owned by art galleries and collectors all over the world. Most original paintings can be viewed at Homemuseum in Zuelpich(Germany)

1822 births
1910 deaths
People from Euskirchen (district)
German artists
People from the Province of Jülich-Cleves-Berg
Düsseldorf school of painting